The 1995 Rugby World Cup was the third Rugby World Cup. It was hosted and won by South Africa, and was the first Rugby World Cup in which every match was held in one country.

The World Cup was the first major sporting event to take place in South Africa following the end of apartheid. It was also the first World Cup in which South Africa was allowed to compete; the International Rugby Football Board (IRFB, now World Rugby) had only readmitted South Africa to international rugby in 1992, following negotiations to end apartheid. The World Cup was also the last major event of rugby union's amateur era; two months after the tournament, the IRFB opened the sport to professionalism.

In the final, held at Ellis Park in Johannesburg on 24 June, South Africa defeated New Zealand 15–12, with Joel Stransky scoring a drop goal in extra time to win the match. Following South Africa's victory, Nelson Mandela, the President of South Africa, wearing a Springboks rugby shirt and cap, presented the Webb Ellis Cup to the South African captain François Pienaar.

Qualifying

The eight quarter-finalists from the 1991 Rugby World Cup all received automatic entry, as did South Africa, as hosts. The remaining seven of the 16 positions available in the tournament were filled by regional qualifiers. The qualifying tournaments were broken up into regional associations: Africa, the Americas, Asia, Europe and Oceania. Côte d'Ivoire qualified through Africa, Japan through Asia, Argentina through the Americas, Italy, Romania and Wales through Europe, Tonga through Oceania.

Squads

Referees

Venues
The 1995 tournament was the first Rugby World Cup to be hosted by just one country, and thus, all the venues are within the one country. South Africa were given the rights to host the tournament in 1993, after a meeting between the IRB and both the government led by F. W. de Klerk and the African National Congress. In total, nine stadiums were used for the World Cup, most being owned by local municipalities, and the majority of the venues were upgraded prior to the tournament. Six of the nine stadiums were South African Test grounds. The four largest stadiums were used for the finals, with the final taking place at Johannesburg's Ellis Park.

There were games originally scheduled to have been played in Brakpan, Germiston, Pietermaritzburg and Witbank, but these games were reallocated to other venues. This reduced the number of venues from 14 to 9. The reasons cited for this change had to do with facilities for both the press and spectators, as well as the security. The change in the itinerary occurred in January 1994. Further changes occurred in April, so that evening games were played at stadiums with good floodlighting. It is also thought that Potchefstroom was an original venue.

Venues were paired:
 Pool 1: Cape Town, Port Elizabeth and Stellenbosch
 Pool 2: Durban and East London
 Pool 3: Johannesburg and Bloemfontein
 Pool 4: Pretoria and Rustenburg

Pools & format

The tournament was contested by 16 nations using the same format that was used in 1987 and 1991 and in total 32 matches were played. The competition began on 25 May, when the hosts South Africa defeated Australia 27–18 at Newlands in Cape Town. The tournament culminated with the final between South Africa and the All Blacks at Ellis Park in Johannesburg on 24 June. In total, the tournament ran for thirty days. The nations were broken up into four pools of four, with each pool consisting of two teams that were automatically qualified and two that went through the qualifying tournaments.

Points system

The points system that was used in the pool stage was unchanged from 1991:
3 points for a win
2 points for a draw
1 point for playing

Knockout stage

Pool winners were drawn against opposite pool runners-up in the quarter-finals. For example, the winner of A faces the runner up of B, and the winner of B face the runner-up of A. The whole finals stage adopts a knock-out format, and the winners of the quarter-finals advance to the semi-finals, where winner 1 faces winner 2, and winner 3 faces winner 4. The winners advance to the final, and the losers contest a third/fourth place play-off two days before the final.

A total of 32 matches (24 pool stage & 8 knock-out) were played throughout the tournament over 30 days from 25 May to 24 June 1995.

Pool stage

Pool A

Pool B

Pool C

Pool D

Three minutes into the match between Ivory Coast and Tonga, the Ivorian winger Max Brito was crushed beneath several other players, leaving him paralysed below the neck.

Knockout stage

Quarter-finals

Semi-finals

Third-place play-off

Final

The final was contested by New Zealand and hosts South Africa. Both nations finished undefeated at the top of their pools. South Africa defeated Western Samoa in the quarter-finals, and then France in the semi-finals to reach the final; New Zealand defeated Scotland in the quarter-finals, and England in the semi-finals, a game in which Jonah Lomu famously scored four tries for the All Blacks. The final was played at Ellis Park in Johannesburg and refereed by Ed Morrison of England. To this point, New Zealand had led the tournament in production, outscoring their opponents 315–104, while South Africa had outscored their opponents 129–55. The tight Springbok defence would keep the high scoring All Blacks in check – particularly Jonah Lomu and Marc Ellis, who had already scored a then World Cup record seven tries each in the tournament – with neither team scoring a try in the match.

South Africa led 9–6 at half time, and New Zealand levelled the scores at 9–9 with a drop goal in the second half. Though Andrew Mehrtens almost kicked a late drop goal for the All Blacks, the score remained tied at full-time, forcing the game into extra time. Both teams scored penalty goals in the first half of extra time, but Joel Stransky then scored a drop goal to win the final for South Africa.

What happened after the match has become an iconic moment in the history of the sport. Nelson Mandela, wearing a Springbok rugby jersey and cap, presented the Webb Ellis Cup to South African captain François Pienaar to the delight of the capacity crowd. The moment is thought by some to be one of the most famous finals of any sport.

Statistics

The tournament's top point scorer was France's Thierry Lacroix, who scored 112 points. Marc Ellis and Jonah Lomu, both of New Zealand, scored the most tries, with seven each.

Broadcasters
The event was broadcast in Australia by Network Ten and in the United Kingdom by ITV.

Commemorative coins
The South African Mint issued a one-ounce gold proof "Protea" coin with a total mintage of 406 pieces to commemorate the event being hosted by South Africa.

Popular culture
Mandela and Pienaar's involvement in the World Cup is the subject of the John Carlin book Playing the Enemy: Nelson Mandela and the Game That Made a Nation, its 2009 film adaptation Invictus, and the ESPN TV documentary The 16th Man in 2010.

References

External links

 Official Rugby World Cup Site
 1995 Rugby World Cup at ESPN 
 Full Results and Statistics at ESPN

 
1995 rugby union tournaments for national teams
1995
1995 in South African rugby union
1995 in rugby union
Rugby union and apartheid
May 1995 sports events in Africa
[[Category:Jun